Chulabhorn is a district (amphoe) of Nakhon Si Thammarat province, southern Thailand.

The district was named in honour of Princess Chulabhorn, the youngest daughter of King Bhumibol Adulyadej, on her 36th birthday.

History
The district was created on 7 March 1994 by merging the two tambons, Ban Khuan Mut and Ban Cha-uat of Cha-uat district and the four tambons Khuan Nong Khwa, Thung Pho, Na Mo Bun, and Sam Tambon of Ron Phibun district.

Geography
Neighboring districts are (from the north clockwise): Ron Phibun, Cha-uat, and Thung Song.

Administration

Central administration 
Chulabhorn is divided into six sub-districts (tambons), which are further subdivided into 30 administrative villages (mubans).

Local administration 
There are five sub-district administrative organizations (SAO) in the district:
 Ban Cha-uat consisting of sub-districts Ban Khuan Mut and Ban Cha-uat.
 Khuan Nong Khwa consisting of sub-district Khuan Nong Khwa.
 Thung Pho consisting of sub-district Thung Pho.
 Na Mo Bun consisting of sub-district Na Mo Bun.
 Sam Tambon consisting of sub-district Sam Tambon.

References

External links
amphoe.com

Districts of Nakhon Si Thammarat province